Route 307 is a provincial road located in the Outaouais region of Quebec. The road runs mostly parallel to the Gatineau River on the eastern side of it. It starts at the corner of Rue Saint-Louis and Boulevard Greber in the Gatineau sector of the city of Gatineau. It runs north of Gatineau and ends in Val-des-Bois at the junction of Route 309 which runs from the Buckingham sector north into the Upper Laurentians.

The main communities the highway passes through are Gatineau, Cantley and Val-des-Monts. In Gatineau, it is known as Rue Saint-Louis, in Cantley it is known as Montée de la Source and in Val-des Monts it is named Route Principale.

On June 23, 2010, part of the highway was closed between Val-des-Bois and Bowman, due to a partial bridge collapse caused by a 5.0 magnitude earthquake.

Municipalities along Route 307
 Val-des-Bois
 Bowman
 Val-des-Monts
 Cantley
 Gatineau

Major intersections

See also
List of Quebec provincial highways
List of Gatineau roads

References

External links 
 Official Transport Quebec Map 
 Route 307 on Google Maps

307